Lam Hau Tsuen is a walled village in Ping Shan, Yuen Long District, Hong Kong.

Administration
Lam Hau Tsuen is a recognized village under the New Territories Small House Policy. It is one of the 37 villages represented within the Ping Shan Rural Committee. For electoral purposes, Lam Hau Tsuen is part of the Ping Shan South constituency.

History
At the time of the 1911 census, the population of Lam Hau was 237. The number of males was 107.

See also
 Walled villages of Hong Kong

References

External links

 Delineation of area of existing village Lam Hau Tsuen (Ping Shan) for election of resident representative (2019 to 2022)
 Antiquities Advisory Board. Historic Building Appraisal. Entrance Gate, Lam Hau Tsuen, Ping Shan Pictures
 Antiquities Advisory Board. Historic Building Appraisal. Shrine, Lam Hau Tsuen, Ping Shan Pictures
 Antiquities Advisory Board. Historic Building Appraisal. Yan Shau Tong, No. 150 Lam Hau Tsuen, Ping Shan Pictures

Walled villages of Hong Kong
Ping Shan
Villages in Yuen Long District, Hong Kong